Deshun Deysel (born 9 April 1970) is a South African mountaineer and businesswoman who was part of the first South African expedition to Mount Everest in 1996. This was the first time the new South Africa flag was planted on top of the world. She has climbed some of the world's highest mountains in 14 expeditions over 5 continents in 15 years.

Known as a high altitude mountaineer, her career started out as a teacher. She has since developed into one of South Africa's leading motivational speakers during the past 20 years. Deshun is the founder and director of Deshun Deysel & Associates, a business that focuses on encouraging and equipping leadership in a context of change and diversity.

Deshun is Laureus Sports Ambassador since 2010

References

External links
 Deshun Deysel & Associates

South African businesspeople
1970 births
Living people
Coloured South African people